The 2016 1. divisjon was the second tier of Norwegian women's football in 2016. The season kicked off on 16 April 2016, finishing on 6 November 2016.

The top placed team was be promoted to next year's Toppserien. The second placed team contested a playoff against the 11th placed team from the 2016 Toppserien for the right to play in Toppserien next season.

Table
 Grand Bodø − promoted
 Lyn
 Byåsen
 Fløya
 Øvrevoll Hosle
 Grei
 Kongsvinger
 Åsane
 Fart
 Amazon Grimstad
 Fortuna Ålesund − relegated
 Raufoss − relegated

References

Fotball.no

2016
2
Norway
Norway